Baetis bicaudatus is a species of small minnow mayfly in the family Baetidae. It is found in southwestern, northern Canada, the western United States, and Alaska.

References

Further reading

 

Mayflies
Articles created by Qbugbot
Insects described in 1923